Edward Alexander McMillan (born November 25, 1951) is a former professional American football player who played in seven National Football League seasons from 1973–1979 for the Los Angeles Rams, the Seattle Seahawks and the Buffalo Bills.  He played college football at Florida State University.

References

1951 births
Living people
Players of American football from Tampa, Florida
American football defensive backs
Florida State Seminoles football players
Los Angeles Rams players
Seattle Seahawks players
Buffalo Bills players